Walter Szczerbiak Sr. (born August 21, 1949) is an American former professional basketball player. At , Szczerbiak played at the small forward position.

On February 3, 2008, Szczerbiak was chosen as one of the 50 most influential personalities to European club basketball, over the previous half-century, by the EuroLeague Basketball Experts Committee.

College career
Born in Hamburg, West Germany, Szczerbiak attended George Washington University, where he played college basketball with the George Washington Colonials. In 1985, he was inducted into the GW Athletics Hall of Fame.

Club career
After college, Szczerbiak was drafted by the Phoenix Suns, in the 4th round (14th pick, 65th overall) of the 1971 NBA Draft. He was also drafted by the Dallas Chaparrals, of the American Basketball Association (ABA), in the 1971 ABA Draft.

Szczerbiak played in the ABA during the 1971–72 season, as a member of the Pittsburgh Condors.  He then joined the Kentucky Colonels, who selected him in the Condors' dispersal draft, but he was later cut from Kentucky's roster.

Szczerbiak won three EuroLeague titles with the Spanish League club Real Madrid (1974, 1978, and 1980). He also won the FIBA Intercontinental Cup three times with Real Madrid (1976, 1977, and 1978). He was named the MVP of the 1977 FIBA Intercontinental Cup.

Personal life
Szczerbiak was born in West Germany to Ukrainian parents who met in a refugee camp, after World War II. They later emigrated to Pittsburgh. His son Wally is a former NBA player.

References

External links

 Euroleague.net Profile
 Real Madrid Basketball Legends 
 RealMadrid.com Walter Szczerbiak 
 RealMadrid.com Walter Szczerbiak 
 Spanish League Profile 
 Italian League Profile 

1949 births
Living people
American expatriate basketball people in Spain
American men's basketball players
American people of Ukrainian descent
Basketball players from Pittsburgh
CB Canarias players
Dallas Chaparrals draft picks
George Washington Colonials men's basketball players
Kentucky Colonels players
Liga ACB players
Phoenix Suns draft picks
Pittsburgh Condors players
Real Madrid Baloncesto players
Small forwards
Sportspeople from Hamburg
Wilkes-Barre Barons players